"Lick It Up" is a song by American rock band Kiss. It is the title track to the group's 1983 album of the same name. The song was released as the album's first single, and it was a Top 40 hit in the United Kingdom, although it failed to chart as highly in the band's native U.S. Musicians Paul Stanley and Vinnie Vincent composed the track.

"Lick It Up" is a staple of the band's live performances. Due to its popularity among fans, Kiss has performed the song over one thousand and five hundred times as of December 2022, making it one of the group's top ten most played pieces.

Song information
A video was made to promote the single. It was the first music clip to feature the band without its makeup. The video premiered on MTV on September 18, 1983, in a half-hour special hosted by J. J. Jackson. Despite the hype and promotion for the single, it stalled at #66 on the American Billboard Hot 100. However, the song broke into the Top 40 in several other countries.

Kiss has performed "Lick It Up" on most of its tours since the single's release. The track was featured on the group's live albums Alive III and Kiss Symphony: Alive IV. It also appears on 2001's The Box Set. While a few others have been played in limited to rare occasions over the years, it is the only song from the band's unmasked era that has been regularly played live as a setlist staple since they returned to wearing their trademark makeup in 1996.

Reception
Cash Box said that "high lead and backup vocals over a slowly throbbing guitar and drum rhythm set up an instructive lesson in feeling good."

Personnel
Kiss
Paul Stanley – lead vocals, rhythm guitar
Gene Simmons – bass guitar, backing vocals
Eric Carr – drums, percussion, backing vocals
Vinnie Vincent – lead guitar, additional vocals

Chart performance

Popular culture
The song is featured in the TV series The Sopranos
It is also featured in the video game Grand Theft Auto: Vice City Stories, on the V-Rock radio station. 
The Kiss Symphony version appears in the video game Tony Hawk's Underground. 
The studio version of the song appears in the TV series "Family Guy" during the episode "Girl, Internetted."
The studio version of the song appears in the 2001 film Rock Star
The studio version of the song appears in the 2022 film Bones and All

See also

1983 in music
Kiss discography

References

1983 singles
1983 songs
Kiss (band) songs
Mercury Records singles
Songs written by Paul Stanley
Songs written by Vinnie Vincent